Michel-Ange–Molitor is a station of the Paris Métro in the 16th arrondissement, serving as an interchange between Line 9 and Line 10 (eastbound only). It is named after the nearby rue Michel-Ange, which was in turn named after Michelangelo (the nearby Michel-Ange—Auteuil station was also named after him) as well as the nearby rue Molitor, which was named after Count Gabriel-Jean-Joseph Molitor (1770-1849), a Marshal of France.

History
The station opened on 30 September 1913 when Line 8 was extended from Charles Michels (then called Beaugrenelle) to Porte d'Auteuil. Line 9's platforms opened on 8 November 1922 with the opening of the initial section of the line from Trocadéro to Exelmans. On 27 July 1937, the section of line 8 between La Motte-Picquet–Grenelle and Porte d'Auteuil, including Michel-Ange–Molitor was transferred to line 10 during the reconfiguration of lines 8, 10, and the old line 14. However, service between Porte d'Auteuil and Jussieu was not provided until two days later, on July 29 , with service initially limited to La Motte-Picquet-Grenelle.

As part of the "Renouveau du métro" programme by the RATP, the station's corridors was renovated and modernised on 27 July 2010.

In 2019, the station was used by 2,247,014 passengers, making it the 231st busiest of the Métro network out of 302 stations.

In 2020, the station was used by 1,180,095 passengers amidst the COVID-19 pandemic, making it the 222nd busiest of the Métro network out of 305 stations.

In 2021, the station was used by 1,420,552 passengers, making it the 241st busiest of the Métro network out of 305 stations.

Passenger services

Access 
The station has a single access at rue Molitor and has a rare Val d'Osne totem.

Station layout

Platforms 
Line 9's station have a standard configuration with 2 tracks surrounded by 2 side platforms whereas line 10's station has a uncommon configuration. It has two tracks flanking a single island platform. Only the southern track is used for regular commercial use for traffic towards Chardon Lagache. The northern track, however, is only used for occasional trains coming from Porte d'Auteuil (usually the first train in the mornings as well as during events at the nearby Parc des Princes).

Other connections 
The station is also served by line 62 (only in the direction of Porte de France) of the RATP bus network.

Gallery

References

Paris Métro stations in the 16th arrondissement of Paris
Railway stations in France opened in 1913